Kichik is a village in Osh Region of Kyrgyzstan. It is part of the Kara-Suu District. Its population was 321 in 2021.

References

Populated places in Osh Region